Duchess Marie-Thérèse of Württemberg (born 12 November 1934), known as the Duchess of Montpensier, is a German-born aristocrat. A daughter of the claimant to the royal throne of Württemberg, abolished in 1918, she was the first wife of Prince Henri, Count of Clermont. Marie-Thérèse is the mother of Prince Jean, Duke of Vendôme, head of the House of Orléans and Orléanist claimant to the French throne.

Family
Marie Thérèse was the fifth child and fourth daughter of Philipp Albrecht, Duke of Württemberg, and his second wife, Archduchess Rosa of Austria, Princess of Tuscany. She was born at Altshausen Castle, Baden-Württemberg, Germany.

Marriage and issue
Marie Thérèse married Prince Henri, Count of Clermont, eldest son of Henri, Count of Paris, and his wife, Princess Isabelle of Orléans-Braganza, on 5 July 1957 in Dreux, France. Three years later, her younger brother Carl, Duke of Württemberg, would marry Henri's younger sister, Princess Diane d'Orléans.

Marie Thérèse and Henri had five children:
 Princess Marie d'Orléans (born 1959), married to Prince Gundakar of Liechtenstein (born 1949), son f Prince Prince Johann Baptist of Liechtenstein (1914 - 2004) and his wife, Princess Clothilde of Thurn und Taxis (1922-2009).
 Prince François, Count of Clermont (7 February 1961 - 30 December 2017), severely disabled from toxoplasmosis.
 Princess Blanche d'Orléans (born 10 September 1962, Ravensburg), severely disabled from toxoplasmosis.
 Prince Jean, Count of Paris (born 19 May 1965), married to Philomena de Tornos y Steinhart (born 19 June 1977)
 Prince Eudes, Duke of Angoulême (born 18 March 1968), married to Countess Marie-Liesse de Rohan-Chabot (born 29 June 1969), daughter of Count Louis Meriadec de Rohan-Chabot (b. 1937) and his wife, Princess Isabelle de Bauffremont-Marnay (b. 1944).

Marie Thérèse and Henri were legally separated on 23 February 1977, divorced on 3 February 1984, and the marriage was canonically annulled in March 2009. Upon her divorce from Prince Henri in 1984, she was given the title Duchess of Montpensier by her former father-in-law, as head of the Orléans dynasty.

Ancestry

References

1934 births
Living people
People from Altshausen
Princesses of France (Orléans)
Duchesses of Württemberg
Duchesses of Montpensier